Gods and Monsters may refer to:

Entertainment
Gods and Monsters (audio drama), based on Doctor Who
Gods and Monsters (film), a 1998 film about the film director James Whale
"Gods and Monsters" (Moon Knight), an episode of television series Moon Knight
"Gods and Monsters" (The Vampire Diaries), an episode of TV series The Vampire Diaries
Immortals Fenyx Rising, a 2020 video game by Ubisoft previously titled Gods and Monsters.
Justice League: Gods and Monsters, a 2015 direct-to-video animated superhero film
"Gods and Monsters", the first chapter of the DC Universe

Music
Gods and Monsters (band), a New York rock band

Albums
Gods and Monsters (I Am Kloot album)
Gods and Monsters (Juno Reactor album)
Gods and Monsters (Gary Lucas album)

Songs
"Gods & Monsters" (song), a song by Lana Del Rey from her EP Paradise
 "Gods and Monsters", a song by John 5 from the album Songs For Sanity

See also
Of Monsters and Men, an Icelandic indie folk/rock band